Prusakova is a feminine surname. Notable people with the surname include:

 Lana Prusakova (born 2000), Russian freestyle skier
 Maria Prusakova (born 1983), Russian politician
 Marina Prusakova (born 1941), Russian-American pharmacist and widow of Lee Harvey Oswald
 Mariya Prusakova (born 1989), Russian snowboarder

See also 
 Pruszków

Surnames of Russian origin